Sarmistha Pritam (b. 18 December 1987) is an Assamese writer. She is also an advocate for people with spinal muscular atrophy.

Early life and education
Sarmistha Pritam was born on 18 December 1987 in Phulaguri, Nagaon, Assam. At age 5, she was diagnosed with spinal muscular atrophy, which by age 8 caused significant physical impairments. 

She studied economics and graduated with good academic marks. She started her schooling at Phulaguri L.P school and later she joined Phulaguri High School. She passed her higher secondary education from Raha High School and Higher Studies from Raha College.

Literary career
She started her career as daily writer of various Assamese magazine and newspapers. By 2013, she had published a collection of articles, Daworiya Akaxor Beli (The sun in a gloomy sky), a collection of poems, Dokmokali (Daybreak), and an autobiography Atmakatha. Her fourth book was written for children, titled Aalphulor Xopun (Aalphul's dream).

In 2015, she wrote to Prime Minister Narendra Modi for help with obtaining her royalties from the National Book Trust for the English and Hindi versions of her autobiography. By 2021, she had also written Anatahin, Rang, Balukat Biyoli Bela and Poran Nigore.

In 2021, filmmaker Bobby Sarma Baruah announced her next film, Deoka (Walking in the Air) is based on the life of Pritam.

Advocacy
Pritam is a member of Ellora Vigyan Mancha, an NGO that promotes science. In 2021, she advocated for people with spinal muscular atrophy and assistance from the government for the costs of treatment.

Works
 Atmakatha (autobiography)
 Aalfulor xopun (children novel)
 Antaheen (a biographical sketch on life and works of motivational speaker Nick Vujicic)
 Sun on my face (English Translation of the autobiography written in Assamese, Translated by Prafulla Katoky. Published by National Book Trust)
 Mera jiwon meri kahani (Hindi translation of atmakatha by Gajendra Rathi. Published by NBT)
Rang (Novel)
Balukat Biyali Bela (Novel)

Awards 
 2012 Munin Borkataki Award, for Atmakatha
 2015 State government literary award
 Gitanjali Baruah Mili Literary award, 2017
 Devsons special Literary award, 2017
 2017 K.K.Handiqui National Fellowship
 Homan Bargohani Bata Literary award, for Rang

References

Journalists from Assam
Living people
People from Nagaon district
Women writers from Assam
1987 births
21st-century Indian women writers